Mid Tyrone was a UK parliamentary constituency in Ireland. It returned one Member of Parliament (MP) to the British House of Commons 1885–1918.

Before the 1885 general election the area was part of the Tyrone constituency. From the dissolution of Parliament in 1918 Mid Tyrone was divided between the new North-East Tyrone and North-West Tyrone constituencies.

Boundaries
This constituency comprised the central part of County Tyrone, consisting of the barony of East Omagh and that part of the barony of Strabane Upper not contained within the constituency of North Tyrone.

Members of Parliament

1Anti-Parnellite Nationalist 1891–1900

Elections

Elections in the 1880s

Elections in the 1890s

Elections in the 1900s

Elections in the 1910s

References

Parliamentary Election Results in Ireland, 1801–1922, edited by B.M. Walker (Royal Irish Academy 1978)

External links

Mid Tyrone
Constituencies of the Parliament of the United Kingdom established in 1885
Constituencies of the Parliament of the United Kingdom disestablished in 1918